Alois Anton Zingerle (11 August 1933 – 15 November 2022) was an Italian politician. A member of the South Tyrolean People's Party, he served in the Landtag of South Tyrol from 1979 to 1988.

Zingerle died in Natz-Schabs on 15 November 2022, at the age of 89.

References

1933 births
2022 deaths
South Tyrolean People's Party politicians
Members of the Landtag of South Tyrol
20th-century Italian politicians
Germanophone Italian people
University of Innsbruck alumni